The Janitor is a fictional character, played by Neil Flynn in the American comedy-drama Scrubs. Though he is a janitor at Sacred Heart, he is rarely referred to as the janitor, but rather just called Janitor.

Neil Flynn was originally billed as a recurring guest star throughout Season 1, although he appeared in all 24 episodes of that season. He was promoted to a series regular beginning with Season 2 and remained a regular through to Season 8. He made his final appearance in the Season 9 premiere, "Our First Day of School", as a guest star.

Janitor appeared in every episode during the first eight seasons except Season 2's "My Lucky Day" and Season 8's "My Last Words", "My Absence" and "My Full Moon".

Fictional character biography 
In the series' pilot episode, protagonist J.D. sees Janitor fixing a sliding door that is stuck, and suggests someone might have stuck a penny in the door. Janitor immediately accuses J.D. of sabotaging the door, and swears revenge. For the rest of the series, Janitor makes it his personal mission to torment J.D. with insults, mind games and practical jokes. In the season eight finale, J.D. admits to accidentally sticking the penny in the door; Janitor replies he saw J.D. do it and began torturing him because he failed a "test of character" by keeping silent about it. Some of Janitor's practical jokes have been on the severe side, such as destroying J.D.'s bike (twice), trapping him in a water tower, stranding him in the middle of nowhere, and tricking him into robbing a couple's house.

Neil Flynn has said: 

It is suggested in the episode "His Story III" that he is in some way responsible for a medical intern named Jill having a child.

During the first six seasons he has a crush on Dr. Elliot Reid, but in season seven he meets his future wife Lady, and they get married the following season.

In the first episode of season 9, a flashback is seen of Janitor's last appearance the day after J.D. leaves Sacred Heart. Janitor believes that J.D. is simply hiding, as a practical joke, and will reappear. When Turk convinces him that J.D. has left for good, Janitor hands over his mop to Turk and leaves, never to be seen again.

In episode 6x15 he states he has converted to the Norse religion.

Personality
Concrete information about Janitor's personal history is sparse and is confounded by his penchant for giving outrageous (and often conflicting) accounts of his past. Many of the stories he has told J.D. are patently absurd, some bordering on the surreal or fantastical.

He has claimed that his parents are also his siblings, has made multiple conflicting accounts of having been married and having children, has claimed that, in college, he came close to a world record in the 100m hurdles race, and has given an explanation for learning sign language so convoluted that he asks to have it read back to him when J.D. asks if any part of it is true. His childhood and family life are equally mysterious. The occasional flashback sequences imply that his parents were fastidious and mildly abusive. One flashback implies the loss of a stuffed animal in the "clutter" of his bedroom led him to take on a janitorial career. He also claims that his great-grandfather was the Civil War general Ambrose Burnside (mispronounced "Burnsides"). However, it is hinted on some occasions that Janitor's anecdotes are at times true to some degree, e.g. he does show a considerable skill in hurdles racing in the same episode in which he claims to almost have broken said world record.

Janitor speaks Spanish, Korean, German, Italian and American Sign Language. When the hospital support staff wants dental coverage, he becomes their spokesman.

On occasion Janitor indicates he does little actual work. He tells J.D. that he spends only an hour and a half a day performing his duties at work. He does, however, defend his sanitary responsibilities in the hospital whenever J.D. questions him about it, and he takes great pride in the cleanliness of the hospital's floors.

Although he spends most of the series harassing J.D., on occasion Janitor will torment other characters such as Christopher Turk. This is usually in response to a perceived wrong, such as another character creating a mess in the hospital or disrespecting him.

Several episodes show Janitor pretending to be a doctor ("Dr. Ján Ĩtor") and he also greatly enjoys one occasion when he is asked to assist during a medical emergency. On one occasion, he uses a set of broken defibrillator paddles to pretend to revive a patient (in reality, a pair of pillows and a mop). He also pretends to be the chief of medicine when the real chief, Bob Kelso, is away.

Janitor shows a softer side on several occasions.  He harbors a schoolboy crush on Elliot Reid, to whom he usually refers as "Blonde Doctor". He has also shown genuine compassion for the hospital's patients; in one episode he spends the day talking to a patient with Locked-in syndrome just to keep him company. In another, he joins the others in saying a heartfelt farewell to Nurse Laverne Roberts, who dies of injuries suffered in a car accident. Later, as the hospital mourns Laverne's passing at a bar, Janitor buys them a round of drinks and raises his glass in salute. He later reveals he and Kelso had both slept with Laverne.

Flynn had a small role in The Fugitive.  The show's writers took advantage of this, placing Janitor (in his fictional role) as the real actor in the film. J.D. notices this as he watches the movie. When J.D. confronts Janitor, he (eventually) admits that it really was him — after J.D. explains that he wanted it to be Janitor as it would show him to be more than a bitter wretch, instead a man who once had hopes and dreams, even if they didn't work out — but admonishes him not to tell anyone.

Janitor's father is portrayed as having treated him the way a drill instructor would treat a new recruit.  (His father is played by actor R. Lee Ermey, who famously played a drill instructor in Full Metal Jacket.)  However, Janitor later tells J.D. that his father died when he was young. When J.D. remembers meeting his father, Janitor responds mysteriously that "You met a man."

At the beginning of the eighth season, Kelso's replacement Dr. Taylor Maddox fires Janitor for pulling a prank on J.D. that could have resulted in serious injury. At the end of the episode, he is replaced. He is rehired three episodes later after Maddox is forced out.

Janitor is the self-appointed leader of the "Brain Trust", an unofficial club at the hospital that consists of a rotating cast of Sacred Heart staff members such as hospital lawyer Ted Buckland, surgeon Todd "The Todd" Quinlan, Dr. Doug Murphy (whom Janitor calls "Nervous Guy"), and Lloyd Slawski, a delivery man.  The Brain Trust originally had three other members, but Janitor became fed up with them during lunch, and joined the table behind him where the new members were sitting.

Name 
The mystery of Janitor's name is a running gag throughout the series. In several episodes, he calls himself "Janitor" (even in his own mind), and in many episodes he refers to himself as "Doctor Ján Ĩtor".

In "My Hero", Janitor chastises J.D. for not even knowing his name while Janitor knows many personal details about J.D.'s life (though it's later shown Janitor has been breaking into J.D.'s locker and reading his journal). When J.D. protests that he does in fact know Janitor's real name, Janitor asks him to say it aloud and quickly claps his hand over his name badge so J.D. can't read it.

In "My Manhood", Janitor tells Dr. Cox "I've been called a great many horrible names in my life: backstabber, zebra poacher, Josh..."
(In an interview before Bill Lawrence stated the name of the Janitor is Josh, standing for Janitor Of Sacred Heart but then said this was a joke.)

In the beginning of the eighth season, when Sacred Heart's new Chief of Medicine, Dr. Maddox (played by Courteney Cox Arquette), asks what Janitor's name is, he chuckles and makes reference to the fact she's new, alluding to the fact that  she's oblivious to the fact even the longest-standing members of staff don't know his name. She examines his name tag only to find it says "The Janitor."

Bill Lawrence gave a hint toward Janitor's name at a speech at The College of William and Mary in Williamsburg, Virginia on January 29, 2009. He said that the only clue he had given was that Janitor's name is the same as the janitor on Clone High (Glenn, voiced by Neil Flynn).

In the Season 8 finale Janitor tells J.D. that his name is Glenn Matthews;   When J.D. asks why Janitor is revealing his name only now, Janitor points out that J.D. has never before asked what his name is, and proves that J.D. has already forgotten it.  However just a few seconds later, someone else walks by and calls Janitor by another name, "Tony,"  to which he responds.

In a Twitter post on April 5, 2011, Bill Lawrence confirmed that Janitor was telling the truth when he revealed his name as Glenn Matthews.

On June 30, 2020, on the Zach Braff/Donald Faison Podcast, Fake Doctors, Real Friends with Zach and Donald, show creator Bill Lawrence confirmed again that Janitor's real name is Glenn Matthews.

Figment of J.D.'s imagination

As revealed in the DVD commentary on several episodes, the Janitor character was initially to be used as a figment of J.D.'s imagination if the show had been canceled during the first season or the first half of the second.  This would have been revealed to the audience in the finale.

From the beginning of Season 2, Flynn joins the rest of the main cast appearing in the show's extended opening credits, but the credits were changed back due to objections by NBC, who wanted longer episodes instead. However, he was still acknowledged as a main cast member by the producers as of the second season. Since the start of season two, Janitor has had encounters with most of the other regular characters. He has even had an entire episode ("His Story III") devoted mostly to him. Along with this, in the season 1 episode "My Bad", Elliott throws coffee on the floor and as Janitor looks up in anger she seemingly engages with him and sarcastically says "sorry".

Production notes 
Flynn is an improv comedian and, as such, ad-libs many of his lines.  Although it is often stated that Flynn ad-libs all of his lines, on several parts of the Season One DVD commentaries and special features, both Flynn and series creator Bill Lawrence say that it is generally a mix of ad-libbed lines and the original script, with Flynn usually building on the original lines. Lawrence has also said that the rest of the cast followed Flynn's lead and that he (Lawrence) would occasionally enter the rehearsal room with no idea what scene was taking place due to its lack of resemblance to the original script. Janitor's alter ego, Dr. Ján Ĩtor, is a happy consequence of one such moment of inspiration. Sam Lloyd once commented on Flynn's improvising: "I opened my script up once and it said 'Janitor: Whatever Neil says,' and I just started laughing."

Flynn originally auditioned for the role of Dr. Cox (which ultimately went to John C. McGinley). However, Lawrence asked Flynn if he would consider another part:  the mysterious custodian who makes tormenting J.D. his life's work.

The role of Janitor was originally devised as a one-time gag in the series' pilot episode, Lawrence admitted: "When we watched the pilot, we knew instantly we had to keep this guy around."

In flashback scenes of Janitor's childhood, he is played by Brandon Waters.

References 

Scrubs (TV series) characters
Fictional janitors
Fictional inventors
Fictional actors
Television characters introduced in 2001
Fictional Harvard University people
Fictional bullies
American male characters in television